Agyneta fratrella is a species of sheet weaver found in the United States. It was described by Chamberlin in 1919.

References

fratrella
Spiders of the United States
Spiders described in 1919